Xanthosia tomentosa, common name Lesueur Southern Cross, is a species of plant in the family Apiaceae. It is endemic to Western Australia.

This plant was first described by Alex George in 1968. There are no synonyms for the plant.

Description 
Xanthosia tomentosa is a prostrate to ascending perennial herb, which grows from 20 cm to up to 90 cm high (occasionally) on lateritic gravelly soils. It flowers from  September to December in its native habitat. It is found in the IBRA regions of the Geraldton Sandplains and the Swan Coastal Plain.

References

External links
Xanthosia tomentosa Occurrence data from Australasian Virtual Herbarium

Mackinlayoideae
Apiales of Australia
Flora of Western Australia
Taxa named by Alex George
Plants described in 1968